Kosky Peak is a peak  south of Mount Nordhill in the Welch Mountains of Palmer Land, Antarctica.

References

Mountains of Palmer Land